Heist of the Century may refer to:

The Heist of the Century, 1978 book by Ken Follett detailing a bank robbery by Albert Spaggiari 
Heist of the Century (album), 1998 album by American rapper La the Darkman
 The Heist of the Century (film), a 2020 Argentine comedy thriller film
Jewel theft by Jack Roland Murphy in New York, 1964
Antwerp diamond heist, in Belgium, 2003
Armored van robbery by Toni Musulin in France, 2009
Theft at Musée d'Art Moderne de Paris, in France, 2010

See also
List of bank robbers and robberies
Crime of the century (disambiguation)